Toki Pona (rendered as toki pona and often translated as 'the language of good';) is a philosophical artistic constructed language (philosophical artlang) known for its small vocabulary, simplicity, and ease of acquisition. It was created by Sonja Lang, a Canadian linguist and translator, to simplify thoughts and communication. The first drafts were published online in 2001, while the complete form was published in the book Toki Pona: The Language of Good in 2014. Lang also released a supplementary dictionary, the Toki Pona Dictionary, in July 2021, based on community usage.

Toki Pona is an isolating language with only 14 phonemes and an underlying feature of minimalism. It focuses on simple, near-universal concepts to maximize expression from very few words. In Toki Pona: The Language of Good, Lang presents around 120 words, while the later Toki Pona Dictionary lists 137 "essential" words and a number of less-used ones. Its words are easy to pronounce across language backgrounds, which allows it to serve as a bridge of sorts for people of different cultures. However, it was not created as an international auxiliary language. Partly inspired by Taoist philosophy, the language is designed to help users concentrate on basic things and to promote positive thinking, in accordance with the Sapir–Whorf hypothesis. Despite the small vocabulary, speakers can understand and communicate, mainly relying on context and combinations of words to express more specific meanings.

After its initial creation, a small community of speakers developed in the early 2000s. While activity mainly takes place online in chat rooms, on social media, and in other online groups, there were a few organized in-person meetings during the 2000s and 2010s.

Etymology 
The name toki pona therefore means both 'good language' and 'simple language', emphasising that the language encourages speakers to find joy in simplicity.

Purpose 
Canadian linguist Sonja Lang started developing Toki Pona as a way of simplifying her thoughts during periods of depression.

One of the language's main goals is a focus on minimalism. It is designed to express maximal meaning with minimal complexity. Like a pidgin, it focuses on simple concepts and elements that are near-universal among cultures. It has a minimal vocabulary and 14 phonemes devised to be easy to pronounce for speakers of various language backgrounds.

Partly inspired by Taoist philosophy, another goal of Toki Pona is to help its speakers focus on the essentials by reducing complex concepts to basic elements. From these simple notions, more complex ideas can be built up by simple combining. This allows the users to see the fundamental nature and effect of the ideas expressed.

In accordance with the Sapir–Whorf hypothesis, which states that a language influences the way its speakers think and behave, Toki Pona was designed to induce positive thinking.

Another aim of the language is for the speakers to become aware of the present moment and pay more attention to the surroundings and the words people use. According to its author, it is meant to be "fun and cute".

Although it was not intended as an international auxiliary language, a world-wide online community uses it for communication.

History 

An early version of the language was published online in 2001 by Sonja Lang, and it quickly gained popularity. Early activity took place in a Yahoo! group. Members of the group discussed the language with one another in English, Toki Pona, and Esperanto, proposed changes, and talked about the resources on the  site. At its peak member count, the group had a little over 500 members. Messages in the group were archived in the Toki Pona forum using phpBB.
In 2014, Lang released her first book on the language, Toki Pona: The Language of Good, which features one hundred and twenty words plus three synonyms and provides a completed form of the language based on how Lang used the language at the time. In 2016, the book was also published in French.

In 2008 an application for an ISO 639-3 code was rejected, with a statement that the language was too young. Another request was rejected in 2018 as the language "does not appear to be used in a variety of domains nor for communication within a community which includes all ages". A third request was filed in August 2021, which resulted in the ISO 639-3 code "" being adopted in January 2022.

Toki Pona was the subject of some scientific works, and it has also been used for artificial intelligence and software tools, as well as a therapeutic method for eliminating negative thinking by having patients keep track of their thoughts in the language. In 2010 it was chosen for the first version of the vocabulary for the ROILA project. The purpose of the study was to investigate the use of an artificial language on the accuracy of machine speech recognition, and it was revealed that the modified vocabulary of Toki Pona significantly outperformed English.

In 2021, Lang released her second book, Toki Pona Dictionary, a comprehensive two-way Toki Pona–English dictionary including more than 11,000 entries detailing the use of the language as she gathered from polls conducted in the  Discord server over a few months. The book presents the original 120 words plus 16  (major dictionary words) as gathered from at least over 40% of respondents.

Phonology and phonotactics

Inventory
Toki Pona has nine consonants and five vowels, shown here with the International Phonetic Alphabet symbols. Stress falls on the initial syllable of a word, and it is marked by an increase in loudness, length, and pitch. There are no diphthongs, vowel hiatus, contrasting vowel length, consonant clusters (except those starting with the nasal coda), or tones. Both its sound inventory and phonotactics are compatible with the majority of human languages, and are therefore readily accessible.

Distribution
The statistical vowel spread is fairly typical when compared with other languages.

Of the syllable-initial consonants,  is the most common, at 20% total;  are over 10%, then the nasals  (not counting final N), with the least common, at little more than 5% each, being .

Syllable structure
Syllables are of the form (C)V(N), i.e. optional consonant + vowel + optional final nasal, or V, CV, VN, CVN. The consonant is obligatory in syllables that are not word-initial. As in most languages, CV is the most common syllable type, at 75% (counting each root once). V and CVN syllables are each around 10%, while only 5 words have VN syllables (for 2% of syllables).

Most roots (70%) are disyllabic; about 20% are monosyllables and 10% trisyllables. This is a common distribution, and similar to Polynesian.

Phonotactics

Proper nouns are usually converted into Toki Pona proper adjectives using a set of guidelines. The native, or even colloquial, pronunciation is used as the basis for the subsequent sound conversion. Thus, England or English become  and John becomes .

Allophony
The nasal at the end of a syllable can be pronounced as any nasal stop, though it is normally assimilated to the following consonant.

Because of its small phoneme inventory, Toki Pona allows for extensive allophonic variation.

Writing systems

Fourteen Latin letters, a e i j k l m n o p s t u w, are used to write the language. They have the same values as in the International Phonetic Alphabet: j sounds like English y (as in many Germanic and Slavic languages) and the vowels are like those of Spanish, Modern Greek, or Modern Hebrew. Capital initials are used to mark proper nouns, while Toki Pona roots are always written with lowercase letters, even when they start a sentence.
Besides the Latin alphabet, which is the most common way of writing the language, many alternative writing systems have been developed for and adapted to Toki Pona. Both were included in the book Toki Pona: The Language of Good.

sitelen pona

The  ('good/simple writing/drawing') writing system was devised as an alternative writing system by Lang herself, and first published in her book Toki Pona: The Language of Good in 2014. In it each word is represented by its own symbol. It has been described as "a hieroglyphic-like script that makes use of squiggles and other childlike shapes". Proper names are written inside a cartouche-like symbol using a series of symbols, where each symbol represents the first letter of its word. Symbols representing a single adjective may be written inside or above the symbol for the preceding word that they modify.

In August 2021  was proposed for inclusion on the Under-ConScript Unicode Registry for allocation in the U+F1900..U+F1AFF location.

sitelen sitelen

This more elaborate non-linear system uses two separate methods to form words: logograms representing words and an alphasyllabary for writing the syllables (especially for proper names). The complex artful designs of the glyphs are chosen to help people who use this writing system to slow down and explore how not only the language but also the method of communication can influence their thinking.

's overall aesthetics are inspired by US west-coast comix artists such as Jim Woodring and US east-coast graffiti artists such as Kenny Scharf. The designs of many individual characters are inspired by characters and principles from various other writing systems, including Egyptian hieroglyphs, Chinese characters, Maya script, Miꞌkmaw hieroglyphic writing, Dongba symbols, as well as early Pagan and Christian signs and symbols.

Grammar
Toki Pona's word order is subject–verb–object. The word  introduces predicates,  introduces direct objects, prepositional phrases follow the objects, and  phrases come before the subject to add additional context.

Some roots are grammatical particles, while others have lexical meanings. The lexical roots do not fall into well defined parts of speech; rather, they may be used generally as nouns, verbs, modifiers, or interjections depending on context or their position in a phrase. For example,  may mean "they ate" or "it is food".

Sentence structures 
A sentence may be an interjection, statement, wish/command, or question.

Statements follow the normal structure of subject-predicate with an optional  phrase at the beginning. The direct object marker  comes before direct objects. More  and  markers can present new predicates or direct objects.

In commands, the word  comes before a verb to express a second person command.

There are two ways to form yes–no questions in Toki Pona. The first method is to use the "verb  verb" construction in which  comes in between a duplicated verb, auxiliary verb, or other predicators. Another way to form a yes–no question is to put  after the phrase being inquired about. Questions cannot be made by just putting a question mark at the end of a sentence.

Non-polar questions are formed by replacing the unknown information with the interrogative word .

Pronouns

Nouns
With such a small root-word vocabulary, Toki Pona relies heavily on noun phrases, where a noun is modified by a following root, to make more complex meanings.

Nouns do not decline according to number.  can mean 'person', 'people', 'humanity', or 'somebody', depending on context.

Toki Pona does not use isolated proper nouns; instead, they must modify a preceding noun. For this reason, they may be called "proper adjectives" or simply "proper words" instead of "proper nouns".

Modifiers
Phrases in Toki Pona are head-initial; modifiers always come after the word that they modify.

When a second modifier is added to a phrase, for example , it modifies all that comes before it, so (() ) can be 'friend watching', rather than (), which can be 'person good-looking'.

The particle  is placed after the head and before the modifiers, to group the modifiers into another phrase that functions as a unit to modify the head, so  can be ( ), 'good-looking person'.

Demonstratives, numerals, and possessive pronouns come after the head like other modifiers.

Verbs
Toki Pona does not inflect verbs according to person, tense, mood, or voice, as the language features no inflection whatsoever. Person is indicated by the subject of the verb; time is indicated through context or by a temporal adverb in the sentence.

Prepositions are used in the predicate in place of a regular verb.

Vocabulary
Toki Pona has around 120 to 137 words. Each is polysemous and covers a range of similar concepts, so  not only means 'big' or 'long', but also 'important'. Their use relies heavily on context. To express more complex thoughts, the roots can be combined. Essentially identical concepts can be described by different words as the choice relies on the speaker's perception and experience.

Colors

Although the simplified conceptualization of colors tends to exclude a number of colors that are commonly expressed in Western languages, speakers sometimes may combine these five words to make more specific descriptions of certain colors. The phrase  means "a reddish shade of blue" and  means "a bluish shade of red".

Numbers
Toki Pona has words for one, two, and many.

The simplest number system uses these five roots to express any amount necessary. For numbers larger than two, speakers would use  which means 'many'.

This feature purposely makes it impractical to communicate large numbers. For example, using this structure  would mean '102' and  would signify '78'.

Roots history

Some words have obsolete synonyms. For example,  replaced  (protuberance) early in the language's development for unknown reasons.

In the book, the meanings were later merged into ,  being the alternative.

These words were considered outdated because they were not included in the official book.

Provenance

Most Toki Pona roots come from English, Tok Pisin, Finnish, Georgian, Dutch, Acadian French, Esperanto, and Serbo-Croatian, with a few from Chinese (Mandarin and Cantonese).

Many of these derivations are transparent. However, the changes in pronunciation required by the simple phonetic system often make the origins of other words more difficult to see.

Although only 14 roots (12%) are listed as derived from English, a large number of the Tok Pisin, Esperanto, and other roots are transparently cognate with English, raising the English-friendly portion of the vocabulary to about 30%. The portions of the lexicon from other languages are 15% Tok Pisin, 14% Finnish, 14% Esperanto, 12% Serbo-Croatian, 10% Acadian French, 9% Dutch, 8% Georgian, 5% Mandarin, 3% Cantonese; one root each from Welsh, Tongan (an English borrowing), Akan, and an uncertain language (apparently Swahili); four phonesthetic roots (two which are found in English, one from Japanese, and one which was made up); and one other made-up root (the grammatical particle ).

Signed Toki Pona and Luka Pona
Each word and letter has its own sign, which is distinguished by the hand shape, location of the hand on the body, palm or finger orientation, and the usage of one or both hands. Most signs are performed with the right hand at the required location. A few signs, however, are performed with both hands in a symmetrical way. To form a sentence, each of the signs is performed using the grammar and word order of Toki Pona.

It is a separate language with its own grammar, but has a vocabulary that generally parallels Toki Pona. Its grammar is subject-object-verb, and, like natural sign languages, it makes use of classifier constructions and signing space.

Community
The language is fairly well known among Esperantists, who often offer courses and conversation groups at their meetings. In 2007, Lang reportedly said that at least 100 people speak Toki Pona fluently and estimated that a few hundred have a basic knowledge of the language. One-hour courses of Toki Pona were taught on various occasions by the Massachusetts Institute of Technology during their Independent Activities Period.

The language is used mainly online on social media, in forums, and other online groups. Users of the language are spread out across multiple platforms. A Yahoo! group existed from about 2002 to 2009, when it moved to a forum on a phpBB site. For a short time there was a Wikipedia written in Toki Pona (called ). It was closed in 2005 and moved to Wikia/Fandom, and then moved from Fandom to an independent website on 23 April 2021.

The largest groups exist on Reddit, Facebook, and Discord. Two large groups exist on Facebook—one designated for conversation in Toki Pona and English, and the other for conversation in only Toki Pona. The most subscribed Facebook group, in which members communicate in both English and Toki Pona, has over 6k members . The largest community on Reddit has over 15k members . The largest Discord group has over 10k members .

In November 2021, the language was added as an interface language for the video game Minecraft.

Literature 

There are a few published books and many other works in Toki Pona. Many other works are translations of original literature in other languages. Starting in 2020, a group has been working on and publishing a zine in Toki Pona called , and it is officially registered as a zine in the United Kingdom.

Sample texts

The Lord's Prayer 

 (A translation of The Lord's Prayer, by jan Kasape, 2022)

Our holy parent(an English translation)

Hail Mary 
 (Ave Maria, translated by Tobias Merkle, 2020)

Universal Declaration of Human Rights 
Article 1 of the Universal Declaration of Human Rights

The Tower of Babel 
 (The Tower of Babel story, translated by Bryant J. Knight, 2005)

Poem 

wan taso (2003)
ijo li moku e mi.
mi wile pakala.
pimeja li tawa insa kon mi.
jan ala li ken sona e pilin ike mi.
toki musi o, sina jan pona mi wan taso.
telo pimeja ni li telo loje mi, li ale mi.
tenpo ale la pimeja li lon.

Alone (translation of wan taso)
I am devoured.
I must destroy.
Darkness fills my soul.
No one can understand my suffering.
O poetry! My only friend.
This ink is my blood, is my life.
And Darkness shall reign forevermore.

See also

 
 
 Alphabet of human thought
 Hyponymy and hypernymy
 Philosophical language

Notes

References

Publications

This book was translated as: 
This book was translated as: 

This book was translated as:

External links

 – The creator's website.
Toki Pona dictionary
lipu sona pona (toki pona course)
Video lessons by jan Misali on YouTube
updated video lessons by jan Misali (as of yet unfinished video series)
, wiki-based encyclopedia in Toki Pona
Where is Toki Pona used? – A page with many links to Toki Pona related websites.

2001 introductions
Constructed languages
Constructed languages introduced in the 2000s
Analytic languages
Engineered languages
Artistic languages
Isolating languages
Taoism in popular culture